Kirchenpaueria is a genus of cnidarians belonging to the family Kirchenpaueriidae.

The genus has cosmopolitan distribution.

Species
Species:

Kirchenpaueria altitheca 
Kirchenpaueria bellarensis 
Kirchenpaueria bonneviae 
Kirchenpaueria bonnevieae 
Kirchenpaueria curvata 
Kirchenpaueria fragilis 
Kirchenpaueria galapagensis 
Kirchenpaueria goodei 
Kirchenpaueria halecioides 
Kirchenpaueria microtheca 
Kirchenpaueria moneroni 
Kirchenpaueria oligopyxis 
Kirchenpaueria paucinema 
Kirchenpaueria pinnata 
Kirchenpaueria spec 
Kirchenpaueria triangulata 
Kirchenpaueria ventruosa

References

Kirchenpaueriidae
Hydrozoan genera